Li Tingting (born 1989), known professionally as Li Maizi, is a Chinese campaigner and activist for gender equality, sexual harassment awareness, and sexuality. She was detained by police on the eve of International Women's Day in 2015, along with four other activists, for planning to protest sexual harassment on public transport. These four other activists are part of the Feminist Five which, along with Li, includes Wu Rongrong, Wang Man, Wei Tingting and Zheng Churan. They each are activists for different rights. Some of them fight for LGBTQ+ rights, gender equality, sexual harassment awareness, and feminism and women's rights.

Early life
Li's parents believed in freedom of choice in matters of love and marriage, but decided to get married when her mother became pregnant with her. Her family lived in the rural outskirts of Beijing, where her father worked delivering fertilizer. After her father was dismissed from his work, Li's mother took a factory job in Beijing, but continued to be responsible for all domestic matters. According to Li, her father was "rather chauvinistic", which means that he was an aggressive patriarch, and the undisputed head of the household and any affront to him resulted in physical violence towards both her mother and herself.

Activism
During her second year of university, Li set up a Lesbian Community Training Group, offering counseling services and support for university students.

Li has been involved with several public demonstrations in China. In 2012, she walked down a shopping street in Beijing wearing a bridal gown spattered with blood stains with two other volunteers to draw attention to domestic violence in China. Although the crowds were mainly receptive, many observers were reportedly awkward at personal matters being aired in public. During the event, urban management officials followed the three women, reprimanding them for not registering their demonstration. Li also participated in the Occupy Men's Room demonstration with Zheng Churan. The event protested the huge queues for women's toilets by encouraging female demonstrators to use men's toilets in turn with; this disallowed the few men that wanted to use the toilets to do so. This demonstration drew much attention from national and international media, as well as online discussion, particularly for the way it encouraged male solidarity with a gendered cause.

In a 2016 video release, Li stated that her current campaign work focusses on preventing forced marriage.

Detention
On 6 March 2015, police officers arrived at Li's apartment where she was living with her partner. At first, since Li couldn't do anything, Li pulled out her ukulele and played a song, while her girlfriend sang. Li initially did not open the door and overheard conversation between the officers that they had monitored her phone calls. She eventually opened the door when the officers called a locksmith to break through the door. Li reports that the police presented her with a blank detention warrant, searched her apartment and confiscated both her and her partner's electronics. The police then took Li and her partner away in separate vehicles. Li was first taken to the local police station, where police went through her private phone calls. When requested to unlock her phone, Li took the opportunity to delete her WeChat history.

On the evening of 7 March, Li was led to a basement carpark and driven away in a van. Her partner had already been released, but the van held fellow activists Wei Tingting and Wang Man.

The activists were subjected to repetitive questioning by authorities about the planned anti-sexual harassment activity. The questions moved on to the involvement of foreign forces, which Li reports seemed to have made the authorities extremely nervous. Li was also asked about other public protests she had been involved in. The authorities even printed images of a topless protest, censoring the activists' nipples with black crosses. The office of the NGO Li worked for was also raided, as it was through this work that she had been most involved with gender equality advocacy and LGBT work. Although the authorities wanted information about this company, Li was not in a management position. Since her release, Li has stated that the authorities would suddenly burst into the room and shout: “Li Tingting, you haven’t been honest with us, you’re lying again!” Then attempt to intimidate with non-specified new evidence.

On 13 April 2015, Li was released, along with the other four activists. According to her lawyer, the release was conditional, which would allow charges to be brought against Li later.

Aftermath
Li has reportedly been put on the Chinese media blacklist, which means no national media will report on or converse with her. The NGO Li worked for was also shut down as an example.

Li has written opinion pieces for international media, including The Guardian, where she describes her arrest and the situation of women's rights in China. She has also participated in discussion panels and given talks on feminism in China in the United States and UK.

Li graduated from the University of Essex in February 2019.

Awards
100 Women (BBC) - 2015
Gold Award, Contemporary Art Schools' Students' Nominated Exhibition, Today's Art Museum - 2007
Honorable Award, Shanghai Youth Art Exhibition - 2007

Exhibitions 
Li has had 36 exhibitions from 2005 to 2013. She had:

 1 exhibition in 2013
 5 exhibitions in 2012
 5 exhibitions in 2011
 5 exhibitions in 2010
 9 exhibitions in 2009
 4 exhibitions in 2008
 5 exhibitions in 2007
 1 exhibition in 2006 and 1 in 2005

Art 
Li Tingting's art is a contemporary modern style. Most of her pieces are watercolor, usually majority blue or pink. Her art often features landscapes, still life, and repeated or a "pile" of one object (usually plastic bottles or glasses).

References

Living people
Chinese activists
Chinese women activists
1989 births
Chinese feminists
People from Beijing
Chinese LGBT rights activists
BBC 100 Women
People's Republic of China journalists
Women civil rights activists